Nikko may refer to:

Places 
 Nikkō, Tochigi, a Japanese city and tourist destination
 Nikko Botanical Garden, operated by the University of Tokyo
 Nikkō National Park, in Kantō, Japan

Organizations, products, and services 
 Nikkō (train), a train service in Japan
 Nikko Cordial, a Japanese brokerage firm
 Nikko Citigroup, a Japanese financial services company
 Nikko R/C, a toy-grade radio control manufacturer
 Nikko Ceramics, a Japanese manufacturer of fine ceramics
 Nikko Hotels, an international hotel chain
 Nikkō (lens designation) (日光), an early brand used by Nikon Corporation

Fictional characters 
 Nikko, the leader of the Winged Monkeys in the 1939 film The Wizard of Oz
 Nikko, an old man in L. Frank Baum's 1907 novel and 1914 film The Last Egyptian
 Nikko, a character in the comic-strip Minimum Security
 Nikko Halloran, a character in the 1993 film RoboCop 3 played by Remy Ryan

Other uses 
 Nikko (name), including a list of people with the name
 Nikko (bodhisattva) or Suryaprabha, a religious figure

See also
 Niko (disambiguation)